In Custody may refer to:

In Custody (novel), a novel by Anita Desai
In Custody (film), a film based on the novel

See also
Custody (disambiguation)